Dreaming in Black and White is the third studio album by American alternative metal band Trust Company. It was released on March 8, 2011 via Entertainment One Music. This album departed from their original post grunge sound and moved to more of an alternative metal sound. 

The album's lead single, "Heart in My Hands", gained significant radio support and the music video was released on December 15, 2010, via the online music video service Vevo. In 2008, Trust Company released two tracks via Myspace entitled "Stumbling" and "Waking Up". These tracks were re-recorded for the final album and have had subtle changes added to them.

Track listing

References

2011 albums
Trust Company (band) albums